The San Francisco Mime Troupe is a theatre of political satire which performs free shows in various parks in the San Francisco Bay Area  and around California. The Troupe does not, however, perform silent mime, but each year creates an original musical comedy that combines aspects of Commedia dell'Arte, melodrama, and broad farce with topical political themes. The group was awarded the Regional Theatre Award at the 41st Tony Awards.

History

Origins

The group was founded in 1959 by R. G. Davis as a medium of expression of his divergent theatrical concepts. The group debuted with Mime and Word (1959) and The 11th Hour Mime Show (1960). However, by 1961, the group transitioned to the Commedia dell'Arte format to more thoroughly comment on perceived political repression in the United States of America, the growing American Civil Rights Movement and military and covert intervention abroad. In the mid-1960s the group started to rely less on the direct Commedia dell'Arte format and transitioned into a more rambunctious, satirical style. It also began integrating elements of jazz into its musical composition, eventually leading to the inclusion of a jazz band within the troupe. The group gained significant notoriety for its free performances in Golden Gate Park and numerous altercations with law enforcement. They also travelled to Canada and played at Simon Fraser University on Nov. 9, 1966  with “A Minstrel Show or Civil Rights in a Cracker Barrel" by Gary Davis and Saul Landau (SFU Archives Library).The 'Minstrel Show' made its public debut in April 1965 at the Encore Theater on Powell Street in San Francisco, produced by Bill Graham. Its cast included John Broderick, Willie B. Hart Jr., George Matthews, Jason Marc Alexander, Julio Martinez, Malachi Spicer (Kai Spiegel) as the minstrels and Robert Slattery at Interlocutor.

The music for “Minstrel Show” was composed and performed by Steve Reich, who worked with the Troupe for at least two seasons. The Troupe has always been known to employ the best composers and musicians in the area, who work intimately with the actors, writers, and whole theatrical operation. 

By the early 1970s, the Troupe had earned a reputation for opposing capitalism, sexism, and war.

Post-Davis history

In the early '70s Davis left the Troupe when it re-formed as a collective, the members of which operate as the Artistic Director, at which time the Troupe produced one of its most successful shows, The Independent Female (1970). In the 1980s, the group's productions retaliated against the Reagan administration.

Some of the Troupe's popular shows include:

 Factwino meets The Moral Majority (1981), in which Factwino, an alcoholic superhero that became a recurring protagonist, bestowed wisdom upon prominent icons, such as Jerry Falwell
 Steel Town (1984) characterized the plight of steel workers and the decline of steel manufacture in the U.S. For this production, the troupe toured the Midwest, primarily in factory cities.
 The Minstrel Show or Civil Rights in a Cracker Barrel, which satirized entrenched attitudes among liberals and bigots during the Civil Rights Struggle
 Seeing Double, about a two-state solution in the Israeli/Palestinian conflict
 Ripped VanWinkle which explores the  gap between  the optimism of 1968 and the 1988 reality.
 Offshore, about the real cost of globalization
 Eating It, about genetic engineering and profit driven science
 1600 Transylvania Avenue, about corporate government feeding on public wealth
 GodFellas, a farce exposing the dangers of fundamentalism to democracy
 Making a Killing, about war propaganda and the plight of Iraqis contaminated by depleted uranium
 , or Death of the Worker, which juxtaposes the stories of workers taking over two factories - one in Argentina and one in the U.S. - and poses the question: why are  American workers fighting for a seat at the table? Why not fight for the whole table?

As well as the park-based shows, the Mime Troupe also tours nationally and internationally, having performed throughout Europe, Asia, South and Central America, and has won several awards. The group also facilitates community workshops. They are a nonprofit organization. The season traditionally starts on Fourth of July weekend and ends on Labor Day weekend.

Early Mime Troupers include Joe Bellan, Saul Landau, Arthur Holden, Nina Serrano, Steve Reich, John Connell, Robert Nelson, William T. Wiley, Sandra Archer, Robert Hudson, Wally Hedrick, Judy North, Jerry Jump, Fred Hayden,
Victoria Hochberg, Joaquin Aranda, Esteban Oropezo and John Broderick. Posters for several of the 1970s productions were designed by Jane Norling, and are accessible online.

Later veterans include Arthur Holden, Sharon Lockwood, Peter Coyote, Luis Valdez, Barry Shabaka Henley, Bruce Barthol, Joan Holden, Joan Mankin, Melody James, Andrea Snow, Daniel Chumley, Marie Acosta, Jael Weisman, Jim Haynie, John Robb,  Emmett Grogan, Bill Graham, and Ed Holmes.

The current San Francisco Mime Troupe Collective comprises Rotimi Agbabiaka, Michael Bello, Velina Brown, Ellen Callas, Hugo E Carbajal, Michael Carreiro, Marie Cartier, Lisa Hori-Garcia, Taylor Gonzalez, Keiko Shimosato Carreiro, Daniel Savio, Michael Gene Sullivan.

Awards

In 1987, the troupe's Brechtian style of guerrilla theatre earned them a special Tony Award for Excellence in Regional Theater. Red State, the Troupe's 2008 fable about a small Midwest town that, after years of being ignored, demands accountability for their tax dollars, was nominated for a San Francisco Bay Area Theatre Critics Circle Award for Best New Script, as was their 2009 production, Too Big to Fail, which detailed how credit and the philosophy of profit at all costs trap mesmerized citizens in a cycle of debt, while endlessly enriching the capitalists who cast the spell.

Productions

 1959: Mime And Word
 1960: 11th Hour Mime Show 1961: Act without Words 1961: Event I 1961: Purgatory and Krapp's Last Tape 1962: The Dowry 1963: Ubu King 1963: Event II 1963: Film: Plastic Haircut 1963: Ruzante's Maneuvers 1963: The Root 1964: Chorizos 1964: Event III 1964: Mimes and Movie 1965: Tartuffe 1965: The Exception and the Rule 1965: Candelaio 1965: Chronicles of Hell 1965: Civil Rights 1965: Jim Crow in a Cracker Barrel 
 1966: The Miser 1966: Film: Mirage And Centerman 1966: Jack Off! 1966: Olive Pits 1966: Search & Seizure 1966: What's That Ahead? 1967: L'Amant Militaire 1967: The Condemned 1967: The Minstrel Show or Civil Rights in a Cracker Barrel 1967: The Vaudeville Show 1968: Gutter Puppets (Meter Maid) 1968: Little Black Panther 1968: Ruzzante or the Veteran Gorilla Marching Band is Formed 1969: The Congress of Whitewashers or Turandot 1969: The Third Estate 1970: Ecoman 1970: Los Siete 1970: Seize the Time 1970: Telephone Man or Ripping off Ma Bell 1970: The Independent Female 1971: Clown Show 1971: The Dragon Lady's Revenge 1972: American Dreamer 1972: Frozen Wages 1972: High Rises 1972: The Dragon Lady's Revenge 1973: The Mother 1973: San Francisco Scandals of 1973 1974: The Great Air Robbery 1975: Frijoles or Beans To You 1975: Power Play 1976: False Promises/Nos Engañaron 1977: Hotel Universe 1978: Elektrobucks 1979: Can't Pay? Won't Pay! (play)|We Can't Pay, We Won't Pay 1979: Squash 1979: T.V. Dinner 1980: Fact Person 1981: Americans or Last Tango in Huahuatenango 1981: Factwino Meets the Moral Majority 1981: Ghosts 1982: Factwino vs. Armagoddonman 1983: Secrets in the Sand 1983: The Uprising At Fuente Ovejuna 1984: Steeltown 1985: Crossing Borders 1985: Factwino: The Opera 1986: Hotel Universe 1986: Spain/36 1986: The Mozamgola Caper 1987: The Dragon Lady's Revenge 1988: Ripped Van Winkle 1989: Secrets in the Sand 1989: Seeing Double 1990: Rats 1990: Uncle Tom's Cabin 1991: Back to Normal 1991: I Ain't Yo Uncle 1992: Social Work 1993: Offshore 1994: Big Wind 1995: Coast City Confidential 1995: Escape to Cyberia 1996: Gotta Get A Life 1996: Soul Suckers from Outer Space 1997: 13 Days / Trece Dias 1997: Killing Time 1997: La Hembra Independencia / The Independent Female 1997: Revenger Rat Meets the Merchant of Death 1997: Teen City 1998: The Artist Must Take Sides 1999: City For Sale 1999: Damaged Care 1999: The First Forty Years 2000: Eating it 2001: 1600 Transylvania Avenue 2002: Mr. Smith Goes to Obscuristan"
 2003: Veronique of the Mounties
 2004: Showdown at Crawford Gulch
 2005: Doing Good
 2006: Godfellas
 2007: Making a Killing
 2008: Red State
 2009: Too Big to Fail
 2010: Posibilidad or Death of the Worker
 2011: 2012 - The Musical!
 2012: For the Greater Good, or The Last Election
 2013: Oil & Water
 2014: Ripple Effect
 2015: Freedomland
 2016: Schooled
 2017: Walls
 2018: Seeing Red
 2019: Treasure Island
 2020: Tales of the Resistance: Volume 1 (radio play due to the COVID-19 pandemic)
 2021: Tales of the Resistance: Volume 2 (radio play due to the COVID-19 pandemic)
 2022: Back to the Way Things Were

See also
Living Theater
Bread & Puppet
Teatro Campesino
Political drama
St. Stupid's Day
Beach Blanket Babylon - another long-running San Francisco theatre satire group

References

Sources

External links

The San Francisco Mime Troupe official website

"Staging the Revolution: Guerrilla Theater as a Countercultural Practice, 1965-1968"
San Francisco Mime Troupe Archives at Special Collections Dept., University Library, University of California, Davis

1959 establishments in California
Performing groups established in 1959
American satirists
Culture of San Francisco
Mime Troupe
American political satire
Mime Troupe
Regional theatre in the United States
Tony Award winners